Tributo al Amor (Eng.: Tribute to Love) is a compilation album released by the romantic music band Los Temerarios. This album became their fifth number-one album in the Billboard Top Latin Albums chart.

Track listing

CD track listing
This information from Billboard.com

DVD track listing
This information from Allmusic

Chart performance

Sales and certifications

References

Los Temerarios compilation albums
2003 greatest hits albums
2003 video albums